The ARY Film Award for Best Story is the ARY Film Award for the best story of the year. It is one of three writing awards in Technical Awarding category.

History
The Best Story category originates with the 1st ARY Film Awards ceremony since 2014. This category has been given to the best Stories for the films of previous year to the ceremony held by Jury selection.

Winners and Nominees

As of 2014, No nominations were made, winner selection and nomination were wholly made by AFAS Jury of Technical award.

2010s

References

External links 

 

ARY Film Award winners
ARY Film Awards